Bheeshma Parvam is a 2022 Indian Malayalam-language period action-thriller film produced and directed by Amal Neerad. The film stars Mammootty in the lead role alongside an ensemble supporting cast including Soubin Shahir, Sreenath Bhasi, Shine Tom Chacko, Farhaan Faasil, Nadhiya Moidu, Dileesh Pothan, Jinu Joseph, Anasuya Bharadwaj, Harish Uthaman, Lena, Shebin Benson, Anagha, Nedumudi Venu, K. P. A. C. Lalitha and Sudev Nair. The movie is written by Amal Neerad and Devadath Shaji with Ravisankar credited as additional screenwriter. RJ Murukan has penned the additional dialogues.

Amal Neerad and Mammootty were planning to film the film Bilal, the sequel to Big B. Due to COVID-19 lockdown, the project was delayed and decided to collaborate for a small-scale movie. The film was theatrically released on 3 March 2022 and was critically acclaimed by critics. The film broke many box office records for a Malayalam film, crossing the ₹50 crore (US$6.6 million) mark on the fifth day of its release.
 The film is currently the third-highest-grossing Malayalam film of all time in both worldwide and domestic box office.

Plot

The film's story was set In late 1980's , where the film focuses on Anjootti family, a wealthy family in Kochi. The godfather of Anjotti Family, Anjootti Varkey has 5 children - Paily, Mathai, Michael, Simon and Susan. Upon the death of the Anjootti family's eldest son, Paily, Michael, the third son of the Anjootti family in Kochi, had taken over the family business and reins since his older brother (second son) Mathai was a lazy person. In a bid for vengeance, Elsa, whose boyfriend was set on fire by her family, and Pauly, her boyfriend's mother, seek the assistance of Michael on the day of his grandnephew's birthday. 

Shivankutty, Michael's right-hand man, beats Elsa's family as per the instruction of Michael. The whole family of Anjootti family came together for Peter's kid's birthday party. Paily's wife, Fathima, who later married Ali and had two sons Ajas and Ami, had to leave the Anjootti family house because of opposition from Michael younger brother Simon and some others of the family, but they were dear to Michael and his mother Annamma. The horrific past in which Michael slayed the brothers of the Kocheri Family, who had killed his elder brother Paily adds to the family members' fear of Michael. Michael summoned Ami and then offered him a godown for his cafe business, which was in the hands of Mathai's children Peter and Paul. 

Peter and Paul later approach Michael to discuss about the godown issue, but Michael forbids Peter and Paul from the family business for the Anjootti family anymore, as it only causes losses for the family. This increases their hatred towards Michael. James, Molly's brother and a politician, approaches Michael, asking him for support to gain votes in the election. Michael refuses as James has done nothing for the people. This makes him enraged and it brings James, Simon - Michael's younger brother and a priest - ,Peter and Paul closer together to end the dominance of Michael in the family. James brings Kocheri Rajan Madhavan Nair, Kocheri Iravi Pillai's grandson and a crime boss known as Bada Raja of Mumbai to Kochi. 

Michael murdered Rajan's father and uncle for killing Paily in the past, so Rajan's hatred towards Michael was larger than anything. One day, the Anjootti family finds out about the love affair between Ami and Rachel. It leads to a family discussion, where the decision of Michael to unite them and his interference in his daughter's affairs enrages Martin, who already hates Michael for interfering in his attempts to cheat on his wife and Michael's sister Susan. So Martin joins hands with James, Peter, Paul, Simon and Rajan to subdue Michael. Rajan's grandfather Iravi Pillai asks him to kill one of Ali's children to weaken Michael. Ami is then killed on the return journey after opening his cafe at the behest of Rajan, Peter and Paul. Ami's friend Rahim informs Ajas that Peter and Paul may have played a role in Ami's death as some people had seen them on that spot. Ajas comes to Anjootti's house and beats Peter and Paul. 

Michael intervenes and stops Ajas as there is no explicit evidence and warns Peter and Paul. Susan and her son Abel move out of Martin's house after Ami's death. When Michael visits them, Susan and Shivankutty shared their suspicions about Martin's involvement with the Kocheri family in the death of Paily and Ali. It helped Michael realize that Martin was the most dangerous person in the family. After his return from the flat, a gang of thugs controlled by Rajan brutally attacks Michael in which Shivankutty dies. Michael gets hospitalized and regains consciousness after 3 days. Michael decides to take revenge against the perpetrators in the family. Ajas kills Martin by driving a truck over him on Michael's instruction. 

Later, Ajas meets James and gives him a file that contains about his illegal activities. James scoffed saying he would be out in 2 weeks to which Ajas replies that he and Michael will be waiting for him outside. Later, the police arrest James. Ajas then meet Simon's older assault case victims and tell them to register a case against him, and assures the family that nothing would happen to them. Simon is then arrested and Ajas finds Peter and Paul in a garage, where he kills Peter by letting a car ran over him and exiles Paul from Kochi. Rajan is then executed on orders from another goon of Mumbai named Chotta Rajan (who is Rajan's mentee) and Michael, Ajas and Mani visit to confirm his death.

The movie ends with Michael passing on his position to Ajas, who starts dealing with the matters himself, just like Michael used to do in the past.

Cast

Family tree
Dotted lines indicate a love relationship between characters, and dashed lines indicate marriage relationship between characters.

† Indicates a deceased character.

Production

Development

Mammootty and Amal Neerad were originally supposed to collaborate for the sequel to Big B. The film, however, was put on hold due to the COVID-19 pandemic as several scenes were to be shot abroad. The two subsequently teamed up for Bheeshma Parvam. Bheeshma Parvam is the reunion of Amal Neerad and Mammootty after 14 years. The film is produced by the director Amal Neerad himself under the banner of Amal Neerad Productions.

Filming
On 21 February 2021, principal photography began in Kochi. The filming of the film has been wrapped up on 21 September 2021.

Soundtrack

The film's soundtrack album and score was composed by Sushin Shyam. In an interview, Shyam revealed that making process of the soundtrack was a process that kept on evolving throughout the production, explaining: "When I did the teaser of Bheeshma Parvam, I had this idea, which wasn’t connected to the film at all. But after that, we thought of including that too in the film. So, basically it’s a process that keeps evolving, when you create a new tune, you think why not include it too. When I composed the track Parudeesa, it sort of gave me an idea about the music of the entire film.

The soundtrack album, especially the track Parudeesa received highly positive reviews from critics.  Sajin Shrijith of The New Indian Express stated that "Sushin Shyam’s instantly immersive music alternates between various genres, from classical to contemporary and, at one point, evokes one of the spaghetti-western scores of Ennio Morricone". The critic Veeyen wrote, "Sushin Shyam’s arresting musical score leaves an extensive impression, and the upbeat track Parudeesa stands out from among the lot".

Release

Theatrical
The film was originally scheduled to be released on eve of Dusshera (12 October 2021), but was postponed due to shooting works. The film was then scheduled to release on 23 December 2021 but was postponed again. It was scheduled to release on 24 February 2022, but it was again delayed. It finally was released on 3 March 2022.

Home media
The satellite and digital rights of the film were secured by Asianet and Disney+ Hotstar. The film was streamed on Disney+ Hotstar on 1 April 2022, while it was premiered in Asianet on 7 September 2022 coinciding with the actor's birthday and Onam.

Reception

Box office
On the first day of its release, Bheeshma Parvam collected  at the domestic box office.
When it comes to the Kerala box office, Bheeshma Parvam has already emerged as the second all-time highest grosser beating Pulimurugan.It covered the lifetime collection of Pulimurugan within the first 18 days of its release.
 , Bheeshma Parvam grossed over  worldwide.The film is currently the third-highest-grossing Malayalam film of all time in both worldwide and domestic box office.

Critical response
Bheeshma Parvam was critically acclaimed who praised the cast performances (especially Mammootty, Soubin Shahir and Shine Tom Chacko), narrative style, direction, action sequences and technical aspects (soundtrack & musical score, production design,  editing and cinematography).

Sajin Shrijith of The New Indian Express gave a rating of 4 out on 5 and wrote "Don’t go in if you expect a fight scene every five minutes. We get a fair amount of action, but it’s the character-centric moments in Bheeshma Parvam that tower above all else. And it has so many fascinating characters. None of them looked out of place or unnecessary. Everyone has something to contribute. Some traits are suggested through subtle and clever flourishes, like when Shine Tom Chacko’s character Peter reveals his true feelings for a male actor".

Anna M. M. Vetticad of Firstpost rated the film 3.75 out of 5 stars and wrote, “Bheeshma Parvam resides somewhere on the cusp between the Malayalam New New Wave that has taken India by storm during the pandemic and the conventional commercial cinema that continues to get an audience in Kerala. The film’s fight scenes are stylised, yet not repugnantly bloody and in-your-face. The leading man is lionised, but not to a nauseous extent. Women are given some space, but the action is entirely in the hands of men. It is a polished production, but not distractingly glossy. If I had to pick a category, I’d put Bheeshma Parvam in the not-bad-not-great slot. It’s okay.”  

The Times of India rated 4.5 out on 5 and wrote "Right from the beginning, the film is careful enough to set its pace balanced and engaging, even as it organically establishes the characters, along with their backgrounds, place in the family tree and more with ease. Mammootty pleases as the invincible hero through his towering presence, body language, punch dialogues, stunts and more, giving those seeking entertainment enough moments to feel enthralled. Shine Tom Chacko, Sudev Nair and Soubin too are in top form in their respective roles. The treatment of the story has ensured that the women characters in it respectfully portrayed and a special attention to be politically correct, rightly so, is evident and laudAbel. Anend C Chandran’s lens has captured the visuals with gusto and the stunt choreography was also riveting for a movie of the genre".

The Hindu critic SR Praveen stated "All these characters still do not help paper over the fact that much of the basic story lacks any novelty. The simmering discontent within his home, and a man waiting to take revenge for Michael's actions in the past come together to haunt him; but knowing the pattern of such films, we certainly know how it will turn out. Until the last half an hour, Amal builds the film and Michael's character patiently in an unhurried pace that the audience can't be blamed for expecting it all to burst out like a dam towards the end. But this build-up kind of fizzles out towards the end, in what turns out to be a rather tame and hurried climax.".

Sowmya Rajendran of The News Minute wrote "The major players get their own ‘mass’ introduction scenes, and how heartwarming it is to see the audience welcome not only Mammootty but also Soubin, Sreenath Bhasi and Shine Tom Chacko with cheers. If we must persist with drawing parallels with the Mahabharata, Even without putting too much thought into comparisons and parallels with the epic or the Hollywood classic, Bheeshma Parvam still works. There are unexpected moments of humour in the film that had me chuckling several times; like the grandmother who’s watching The Terminator and advises Michael to buy a machine gun to finish his ‘work’ as a gangster quickly".

In popular culture 
A scene in the film where Michael (Mammootty) tells the photographer "Chambiko" (which translates to “Click the photo”) became a viral trend on social media platforms such as Youtube Shorts and Instagram Reels.It trends weddings, family photoshoots, alumni meets and public events became the perfect venue to enact this dialogue, which is followed by Sushin Shyam's earworm of a BGM.

The trend was not limited to family photos.Other film celebrities, politicians, teachers, police officers, sportspersons even soldiers jumped on the 'Chambiko' bandwagon.

politicians including state Minister for Education and Labour V. Sivankutty. Other notable politicians who also joined in on the trend include, Vatakara MLA Parakkal Abdulla and Nilambur MLA P. V. Anwar.

References

External links

2022 films
2022 action thriller films
2020s Malayalam-language films
Indian action thriller films
Films shot in Kochi
Films directed by Amal Neerad
Films scored by Sushin Shyam